Robin Jonathan Norman Smith (born 14 August 1936) was the Bishop of Hertford from 1990 to 2001.

Smith was educated at Bedford School and Worcester College, Oxford before beginning his ordained ministry as a curate at St Margaret's Barking, after which he was chaplain of Lee Abbey then vicar of St. Mary's Church, Chesham, rector of Great Chesham before becoming a bishop. In retirement he is an honorary assistant bishop in the Diocese of St Albans.

References

1936 births
People educated at Bedford School
Alumni of Worcester College, Oxford
Bishops of Hertford
20th-century Church of England bishops
21st-century Church of England bishops
Living people